Javier Adrián Baena (born April 5, 1968 in Buenos Aires, Argentina) is an Argentine former football player. He played for clubs in Argentina and Chile. He played as a defender.

Honours and achievements 
Colo-Colo
 Primera División: 1993

References

External links
 

1968 births
Living people
Argentine footballers
Argentine expatriate footballers
Argentine football managers
Club Atlético Platense footballers
Deportivo Morón footballers
Club Atlético Banfield footballers
Colo-Colo footballers
Chilean Primera División players
Argentine Primera División players
Expatriate footballers in Chile
Estudiantes de Río Cuarto footballers
Association football defenders
Footballers from Buenos Aires